The pyruvate scale measures pungency in onions and garlic with units of μmol/gfw (micromoles per gram fresh weight). It is named after pyruvic acid, the alpha-keto acid co-product created in the biochemical pathway that forms syn-propanethial-S-oxide, the main lachrymatory agent in onions.

Examples 
The standard onion has an eight rating, while "sweet onions" have a two or three rating on the scale. The lower the score or scale the more "sweet" the onions are rated. Anything less than five is considered a sweet onion. The Vidalia onion variety is considered sweet and must have a score of 5.0 μmol/gfw or less. The Supasweet onion (usually grown in Lincolnshire, England) registers 1.5 to 2 on the scale. A standard brown onion is usually in the range of 6–7 out of 10.

Influential factors 
Soil type, rain, and sunlight affect the pungency in onions and garlic and, therefore, their score on the pyruvate scale.

See also 

 Scoville scale

References

External links 

 The National Organic Program — by the USDA

Scales